The Giolitti III government of Italy held office from 29 May 1906 until 11 December 1909, a total of 1,292 days, or 3 years, 6 months and 12 days; it was one of the longest cabinet in the history of the Kingdom of Italy.

Government parties
The government was composed by the following parties:

Composition

References

Italian governments
1906 establishments in Italy